Klosterneuburg (frequently abbreviated as Kloburg by locals) is a town in Tulln District in the Austrian state of Lower Austria. It has a population of about 27,500. The Klosterneuburg Monastery, which was established in 1114 and soon after given to the Augustinians, is of particular historical importance.

Geography

It is located on the Danube, immediately north of the Austrian capital Vienna, from which it is separated by the Kahlenberg and Leopoldsberg hills of the Vienna Woods range. It has been separated from its twin city of Korneuburg on the left bank of the Danube since the river changed its course during the Late Middle Ages. The towns are connected by a reaction ferry link.

At the site of a former pioneer school of the Austrian Bundesheer, Klosterneuburg has various military buildings and former stores which will be developed into a 12 hectare large new quarter of the town by 2030. It is also the centre of a wine growing area, with several esteemed vintners, numerous Heuriger taverns, and the Federal Institute for Viticulture and Pomology, where Fritz Zweigelt bred the Zweigelt and Blauburger red wine grapes.

Its town centre has two main shopping areas, the Niedermarkt and the Rathausplatz, separated by a steep hill.

The town is tightly linked to the Austrian capital and houses some of the most affluent citizens of Lower Austria. It has direct access to the Vienna city centre via the Klosterneuburger Straße highway (B14), by the Vienna S-Bahn network on the Emperor Franz Joseph Railway line (S40) from Franz-Josefs-Bahnhof to Tulln, and along the EV6 The Rivers cycling route. The town is the site of light industry and, whilst not belonging to Vienna, has almost the feel of a suburb. The  of contemporary art and the Institute of Science and Technology Austria established in 2006 are located in the town.

History

Archaeological findings denote a settlement of the area already during the Neolithic period. In the Roman era (1st to 5th centuries), a fort of the Danubian limes stood at the site of Klosterneuburg on the northwestern border of the Pannonia. After Charlemagne had defeated the Avars, a Carolingian settlement in the newly established Avar March recorded as Omundesdorf may correspond to the site of the town. Klosterneuburg itself was first mentioned as Nivvenburc (Neuburg, "New Castle") in an 1108 deed. 

In 1113 it became the residence of the Babenberg margrave Leopold III, the later patron saint of Austria. In 1114 Leopold, son-in-law of the Salian emperor Henry IV by his marriage with Agnes of Wailingen, had a princely castle erected together with a collegiate church on a hill rising directly from the banks of the Danube, which he transferred to Augustinian canons in 1133. This order is one of the oldest and richest of its kind in Austria; it owned much of the land upon which today the north-western suburbs of Vienna stand. Later, Duke Leopold VI of Austria (d. 1230) also had his residence there during parts of his reign. It was also here where Leopold VI's eldest son climbed a tree, fell and died. The monastery complex include the old chapel of 1318, with Leopold's tomb and the Verdun Altar, dating from the 12th century, the treasury and relic-chamber, the library with 30,000 volumes and numerous manuscripts, the picture gallery, the collection of coins, the theological hall, and the winecellar, containing an immense tun like that at Heidelberg.

The market on the left river bank quickly developed in conjunction with the famous monastery on the right bank. While the Danube was an important waterway trade route, it also repeatedly affected the citizens by floods. In the late 13th century, the two parts of the town, Klosterneuburg (the monastery) and Korneuburg (the market), had grown apart, whereafter the Habsburg king Albert I of Germany granted separate town privileges to Klosterneuburg in 1298.

The unfortified "Untere Stadt" was devastated by Ottoman forces in the 1529 Siege of Vienna and the 1683 Battle of Vienna whereas the fortified "Obere Stadt" was successfully defended in both cases. In the 18th century Emperor Charles VI, who could not prevail in the War of the Spanish Succession, set up plans to rebuild the Klosterneuburg monastery complex modelled on the Escorial. The construction of the Baroque buildings began in 1730; however, it did not survive an initial phase.

After the Austrian defeat in the 1805 Battle of Austerlitz, the town was occupied by Napoleonic troops until 1809. A winemaker's town during the 19th century, Klosterneuburg developed to a recreational and residential area of Austrian officials working in the nearby capital. During the Anschluss of Austria to Nazi Germany from 1938, Klosterneuburg was incorporated as the 26th district of "Greater Vienna", which was reversed with the establishment of Wien-Umgebung District in 1954.

At the end of 2016 Wien-Umgebung District was dissolved and Klosterneuburg became a part of Tulln.

Politics

Seats in the town's assembly (Gemeinderat)  local elections:
Austrian People's Party (ÖVP): 24
Social Democratic Party of Austria (SPÖ): 6
The Greens – The Green Alternative: 5
Freedom Party of Austria (FPÖ): 2
Plattform Unser Klsierneuburg (Independent): 2
Hofbauer (Independent): 1
Sozial Aktiv Unabhängig (Independent): 1

Twin town

Klosterneuburg is twinned with:
 Göppingen, Germany, since 1971

Notable people

 Otto of Freising (c.1114–1158), churchman and chronicler
 Johann Georg Albrechtsberger (1736–1809), musician
 Nikolaus Lenau (1802–1850), poet, buried in the Weidling cemetery
 Walter Breisky (1871–1944), politician and Austrian chancellor, died in Klosterneuburg
 Hans Ledwinka (1878–1967), automobile designer
 Franz Kafka (1883–1924), author, died at the Hoffmann sanatorium in Kierling
 Pius Parsch (1884–1954), priest, died at Klosterneuburg
 Wolfgang Hoffmann (1900-1969), architect and designer
 Ernst Plischke (1903–1992), Austrian-New Zealand architect
 Karl Rahm (1907–1947), SS officer, commandant of the Theresienstadt concentration camp executed for war crimes
 O. W. Fischer (1915–2004), film and theatre actor
 Hilde Gueden (1917-1988), Austrian soprano, died in Klosterneuburg
 Leo Navratil (1921—2006), psychiatrist, worked at the Maria Gugging Psychiatric Clinic
 Gustav Peichl (1928—2019), architect 
 Helmut Senekowitsch (1933–2007), footballer, died in Klosterneuburg
Herbert Prohaska (born 1955), footballer, living in Kierling
 Siegfried Selberherr (born 1955), scientist
 Karlheinz Essl, Jr. (born 1960), composer, performer and composition teacher
 Michael Konsel (born 1962), football goalkeeper
 Thomas Aigner (born 1964), TV entertainer, documentary film producer and lecturer
 Martin Nowak (born 1965), biologist and mathematician

Coinage

Klosterneuburg was recently selected as a main motif for a high value collectors' coin: the Klosterneuburg commemorative coin. The obverse shows a view of the abbey from the slopes of the Leopoldsberg in the Alps. The Romanesque-Gothic basilica as well as the copper dome with the imperial crown can be seen.

References

External links 

 Aerial pictures of Klosterneuburg
 360°-Panoramas from Gerhard Edl
 Institute of Science and Technology Austria
 Klosterneuburg Tourism Information
 

 
Cities and towns in Tulln District
Cadastral community of Tulln District
Populated places on the Danube